Kevin Rans (born 19 August 1982 in Ekeren) is a Belgian former pole vaulter.

He finished eighth at the 2000 World Junior Championships and tenth at the 2005 World Championships. He also competed at the 2006 World Indoor Championships and the 2006 European Championships without reaching the final round.

With this performance, he equaled the national record of Thibault Duval. Rans does hold the national junior record with 5.60 metres, and is also a former Belgian junior record holder in the 200 metres with 20.82 seconds.

In March 2009 he tested positive for Corticosteroids. He was first cleared by the Flemish Doping Tribunal, but it was overturned by IAAF and he was handed a 3-month ban.

References

1982 births
Living people
Doping cases in athletics
Belgian sportspeople in doping cases
Belgian male pole vaulters
Sportspeople from Antwerp
Olympic athletes of Belgium
Athletes (track and field) at the 2008 Summer Olympics
World Athletics Championships athletes for Belgium
People from Ekeren